L'Unique was a French individualist anarchist publication edited by Émile Armand. It ran from 1945 to 1956 and reached 110 numbers. Other writers include Gérard de Lacaze-Duthiers, Manuel Devaldès, Lucy Sterne, Thérèse Gaucher and others. Louis Moreau provided illustrations. L'Unique was an eclectic publication with a focus on philosophy and ethics.

See also 
Individualist anarchism in Europe

References

External links 
Information about L’Unique including many articles from it

Individualist anarchist publications
Egoist anarchism
Anarchist periodicals published in France